Linder Township is one of thirteen townships in Greene County, Illinois, USA.  As of the 2010 census, its population was 345 and it contained 135 housing units.

Geography

Unincorporated towns
 Baum at 
 Kahm at 
(This list is based on USGS data and may include former settlements.)

Cemeteries
The township contains these two cemeteries: Hardcastle and Hardin.

Major highways
  Illinois Route 108

Demographics

School districts
 Carrollton Community Unit School District 1
 Greenfield Community Unit School District 10

Political districts
 Illinois' 19th congressional district
 State House District 97
 State Senate District 49

References
 
 United States Census Bureau 2007 TIGER/Line Shapefiles
 United States National Atlas

External links
 City-Data.com
 Illinois State Archives

Townships in Greene County, Illinois
Townships in Illinois